Éric Crosnier (born 22 December 1972) is a French former professional footballer who played as a midfielder. In his career, he most notably played for Tours, Beauvais, Poitiers, Sedan, and Laval.

Honours 
Sedan

 Coupe de France runner-up: 1998–99

Notes

References

External links 
 

1972 births
Living people
Sportspeople from Indre-et-Loire
French footballers
Association football midfielders
Tours FC players
AS Beauvais Oise players
Stade Poitevin FC players
CS Sedan Ardennes players
Stade Lavallois players
OFC Charleville players
AS Prix-lès-Mézières players
Ligue 2 players
Championnat National players
Ligue 1 players
Championnat National 3 players
Division d'Honneur players
French football managers
Association football coaches
AS Prix-lès-Mézières non-playing staff
AS Prix-lès-Mézières managers
OFC Charleville managers
Footballers from Centre-Val de Loire